López or Lopez is a surname of Spanish origin. It was originally a patronymic, meaning "Son of Lope", Lope itself being a Spanish given name deriving from Latin lupus, meaning "wolf". Its Portuguese and Galician equivalent is Lopes, its Italian equivalent is Lupo, its French equivalent is Loup (or Leu), its Romanian equivalent is Lupu or Lupescu and its Catalan and Valencian equivalent is Llopis. 

López is the fifth most common Hispanic surname globally and in Spain and the USA. It is the most common surname in the province of Lugo. It is the most common Spanish surname in the United Kingdom.

Geographical distribution
As of 2014, 34.8% of all known bearers of the surname López were residents of Mexico (frequency 1:40), 10.0% of Spain (1:52), 8.2% of Guatemala (1:22), 7.3% of the United States (1:547), 7.1% of Colombia (1:75), 5.0% of Argentina (1:96), 3.8% of Venezuela (1:88), 2.7% of Honduras (1:36), 2.7% of Peru (1:131), 2.6% of the Philippines (1:438), 2.5% of Nicaragua (1:27), 2.1% of Cuba (1:62), 1.8% of Ecuador (1:99), 1.6% of El Salvador (1:44), 1.4% of Paraguay (1:56), 1.3% of Chile (1:148) and 1.1% of Bolivia (1:104).

In Spain, the frequency of the surname was higher than average (1:52) in the following regions:
 1. Region of Murcia (1:29)
 2. Galicia (1:34)
 3. Castilla–La Mancha (1:36)
 4. Andalusia (1:43)
 5. Asturias (1:48)

In Guatemala, the frequency of the surname was higher than average (1:22) in the following departments:
 1. San Marcos (1:7)
 2. Retalhuleu (1:13)
 3. Jalapa (1:13)
 4. Huehuetenango (1:13)
 5. Quetzaltenango (1:15)
 6. Jutiapa (1:17)
 7. Chiquimula (1:18)
 8. Sacatepéquez (1:18)

In Mexico, the frequency of the surname was higher than average (1:40) in the following states:
 1. Chiapas (1:13)
 2. Oaxaca (1:20)
 3. Tabasco (1:24)
 4. Sinaloa (1:25)
 5. Nayarit (1:31)
 6. Aguascalientes (1:35)
 7. Sonora (1:36)
 8. Campeche (1:36)
 9. Baja California (1:37)
 10. Timor island

Politicians
Adolfo López Mateos, Mexican president
Alfonso López Caballero, Colombian politician
Alfonso López Michelsen, President of Colombia 
Alfonso López Pumarejo, President of Colombia
Alfonso H. Lopez, American politician
Andrés Manuel López Obrador, Mexican President
Antonio López de Santa Anna (1794–1876), Mexican general and dictator
Antonio López-Istúriz White, Spanish politician member of the European Parliament
Augustine Lopez, American politician
Carlos Antonio López, Paraguayan president
Francisco Solano López, Paraguayan president
Fernando Lopez, Filipino politician
Eleazar López Contreras, Venezuelan president
Hermógenes López, Venezuelan president
Igor López de Munain, Basque politician
James Lopez Watson, American judge and politician
José Cortés López, Spanish magistrate and politician
José López Portillo, Mexican president
José López Rega, Argentina's Minister of Social Welfare 
Juan Fernando López Aguilar, Spanish politician
Kamala Lopez, Venezuelan actress, director, and political activist
Leopoldo López, Venezuelan politician
Marco A. López Jr., American politician
Margarita López, Puerto Rican politician
Narciso López, Venezuelan military officer and politician
Nativo Lopez, Mexican-American politician and activist
Oswaldo López Arellano, President of Honduras from 1963–1971 and 1972–1975
Patxi Lopez, Basque socialist politician
Pero López de Ayala, Spanish statesman
Ricardo López Murphy, Argentine economist and politician
Adelardo López de Ayala, Spanish politician
Iñigo López de Mendoza, soldier, politician and poet in Medieval Spain

Athletes
Adrián López Álvarez (born 1988), Spanish footballer
Al López (1908–2005), American baseball catcher and manager
Albie Lopez, American baseball pitcher
Alejandro Lopez, Mexican race walker
Alejo López (born 1996), Mexican baseball player
Alexander López (born 1992), Honduran footballer
Aliuska López, Cuban-Spanish athlete
Andy Lopez (born 1953), American college baseball coach
Ángel López (disambiguation), several people
Antonio López Guerrero, Spanish footballer
Anselmo López, Spanish basketball manager
Ariel López (footballer, born 1974), Argentine forward
Ariel López (footballer, born 2000), Argentine forward
Brook Lopez, American basketball player, twin of Robin Lopez
Camille Lopez (born 1989), French (male) rugby player
Carlos López de Silanes, Mexican footballer
Celestino López, Venezuelan baseball player 
Claudio López, Argentine footballer
Christian López, Guatemalan weightlifter
Christian Lopez, French footballer
Juan Manuel Bellón López (born 1950), Spanish chess grandmaster
Colby Lopez (born 1986), American professional wrestler better known as Seth Rollins
Daniel López (footballer, born 1969), Chilean footballer
Danny Lopez (boxer), U.S. boxer
David López-Zubero, Spanish Olympic swimmer
Diego López Rodríguez, Spanish footballer
Ebrahim Enguio Lopez, Indonesian-Filipino professional Basketball player
Enrique López Pérez, Spanish tennis player
Federico Lopez, Puerto Rican basketball player
Feliciano López, Spanish tennis player
Felipe López (basketball)
Felipe López (baseball player)
Gustavo Adrián López, Argentine footballer
Hannah Lopez (born 1992), American rugby sevens player
Hector Lopez, Panamanian baseball player
Israel López (footballer), Mexican footballer
Jack López, Puerto Rican baseball player
Javier López (baseball) (born 1977), Puerto Rican baseball player
Javy López, Puerto Rican baseball player
Jean Lopez (born 1973), Taekwondo athlete and coach
Jessica López, Venezuelan artistic gymnast
Jorge López (baseball) (born 1993), Puerto Rican baseball player
José Luis López Ramírez, Costa Rican football player
José María López, Argentine racing driver
Juan Antonio Lopez, Mexican boxer
Lisandro López (footballer, born 1983), Argentine footballer
Lisandro López (footballer, born 1989), Argentine footballer
Lucía López, Spanish field hockey player
Manuel López, Argentine boxer
Marc López, Spanish tennis player
Marisa López Argentine field hockey player
Martín López-Zubero Spanish-American backstroke swimmer
Maxi López, Argentine football player
Nancy Lopez (born 1957), American golfer
Nicky Lopez (born 1995), American baseball player
Nicolas Lopez (fencer), French sabre fencer
Omar López (born 1977), Venezuelan baseball coach
Otto Lopez (born 1998), Dominican-Canadian baseball player
Pablo Darío López, Argentine footballer
Pablo López (baseball) (born 1996), Venezuelan baseball player
Raúl López, Spanish basketball player
Reynaldo López (born 1994), Dominican baseball player
Ricardo López, Mexican boxer
Ricardo López Felipe, Spanish football player
Robin Lopez, American basketball player, twin of Brook Lopez
Rodrigo Muñoz López, a major league starting pitcher for the Colorado Rockies
Rodrigo López, a Mexican-American soccer player
Ron Lopez, American football player
Roy Lopez (American football) (born 1997), American football player
Sergio López Miró, Spanish swimmer
Steven López, 2000 and 2004 USA Olympic Tae Kwon Do Gold Medalist
Sue Lopez, English footballer, manager, coach and advocate of the women's game
Teófimo López (born 1997), American world champion boxer
Vidal López, Venezuelan baseball pitcher and manager
Wilton López (born 1983), Nicaraguan baseball pitcher
Yaqui López (born 1951), Mexican boxer and current member of the Boxing Hall of Fame.
Yeimer López, Cuban middle distance runner
Yoan López (born 1993), Cuban baseball player

Film
Adamari López, Puerto Rican actress
Charo López, Argentine actress
Charo López, Spanish actress
Constance Marie Lopez, American actress
George Lopez, Mexican-American comedian
Gabriella Louise Ortega Lopez, Filipina actress, singer, model, vlogger, and recording artist
Gerry Lopez, American surfer and occasional film actor
Jade Lopez, Filipina actress
Jennifer Lopez, American actress, singer, dancer and designer
Liezel Lopez, Filipina actress, model and dancer
Mara Lopez, Filipina actress
Marga López, Argentine-Mexican actress
Mario López, American actor
Martina López, American photographer
Leon Lopez, British actor
Perry Lopez, American actor
Polyana López, Argentine actress
Priscilla Lopez,  American singer, dancer, and actress
Sergi López, Spanish actor
Alencier Ley Lopez, Indian Keralite Actor
Vernetta Lopez, Singaporean actress
Manuel López Ochoa, Mexican actor and singer
Carlos López Moctezuma, Mexican actor

Artists
Alma Lopez, artist
António López García, Spanish painter and sculptor
Carlos Lopez-Barillas, Guatemalan photographer
Carlos Lopez (artist), American painter
Francisco Solano López (comics), Argentine comics artist
Pola Lopez (born 1954), American artist
Teresa López, Puerto Rican artist
Yolanda López, American artist

Musicians and composers
Anselmo López, Venezuelan bandolist
Gabe Lopez, American singer-songwriter and producer
Jesús López-Cobos, Spanish conductor
Jimmy Lopez, Peruvian composer
Lance Lopez (born 1977), American musician
Martin Lopez, Swedish heavy metal drummer
Oscar Lopez (guitarist), Chilean-Canadian folk guitarist
Ricardo López Méndez, Mexican poet and song lyricist. 
Renato López, Mexican musician
Ricky Lopez, Puerto Rican singer, ex-Menudo
Robert Lopez, composer and lyricist of musicals
Rosa López, Spanish singer and dancer of Operación Triunfo
Laia Martínez i López, Spanish writer and musician
Trini Lopez, American musician
Vanessa Lopez, American clarinetist
Vincent Lopez, American bandleader and pianist
Viginia López, American singer

Other people
Alberto López Arce, Cuban chess master
Alfonso López Trujillo, Colombian Cardinal
Andrés Manuel López Obrador, also known as AMLO, Mexican president
Araceli Lopez-Martens (born 1971), French physicist
Awilda Lopez, American criminal
Barry Lopez, American writer
Cachao López, Cuban mambo musician and composer
Carlos Lopez, American Ballet Theatre soloist
Donald S. Lopez, Sr., American Air Force fighter and test pilot
Donald S. Lopez, Jr., American scholar of Buddhism
Eleazar López Contreras, Venezuelan president
Eugenio Lopez Sr. (1901-1975), Filipino politician and founder of ABS-CBN Corporation
Eugenio Lopez Jr. (1928-1999), Filipino businessman and former CEO and president of ABS-CBN Corporation
Eugenio Lopez III (born 1952), Filipino businessman and former CEO and chairman of ABS-CBN Corporation
Felipe López (archer)
Fernão Lopez, first permanent resident of the island of Saint Helena
Francisco Solano López, Paraguayan president
García López de Cárdenas, Spanish conquistador
George A. Lopez, American academic
Gerardo I. Lopez, CEO and President, AMC Theatres
Gina Lopez (1953-2019), Filipino environmentalist and philanthropist
Graciano Lopez Jaena, Filipino hero
 Iñigo López de Recalde, birth name of Ignatius of Loyola, Catholic saint and founder of the Jesuits
Jennifer Lopez (meteorologist), meteorologist for KXAS-TV
Jose M. Lopez, American Medal of Honor recipient
Joseph A. Lopez, Spanish Mexican Jesuit
Juan López de Hoyos, Spanish humanist and educator who was the teacher of Miguel de Cervantes
Juana López (nurse), Chilean army nurse
Kathryn Jean Lopez, American conservative columnist
Lourdes Lopez, New York City Ballet principal dancer
Lynda Lopez, American news anchor
Mario Lopez Estrada, Guatemalan billionaire businessman
Martín López-Vega, Spanish Asturian language writer
Miguel López de Legazpi, Spanish explorer
Nicolás de Jesús López Rodríguez
Nicolás Lindley López, Peruvian military commander
Noelia López, Spanish model
Pedro López (serial killer), Colombian serial killer and rapist
Pura López Colomé (born 1952), Mexican poet, translator
R. Edward Lopez, American newsman and morning radio personality
Ramón López (disambiguation), multiple people
Ruy López de Segura, Spanish priest after whom the Ruy López opening is named
Ruy López de Villalobos, Spanish explorer
Santos López Pelegrín, Spanish journalist
Steve Lopez, American journalist for the Los Angeles Times and author

References

Spanish-language surnames
Surnames of Spanish origin
Patronymic surnames
Surnames of Honduran origin
Surnames of Salvadoran origin
Surnames of Guatemalan origin
Surnames of Colombian origin
Surnames of Uruguayan origin